Dokshytsy District is a district in the Vitebsk Region, Belarus.

Notable residents 
 Kastuś Akuła (1925, Veracei village - 2008), Belarusian writer

References

 
Districts of Vitebsk Region